The low tells at Abu Salabikh, around  northwest of the site of ancient Nippur and about 150 kilometers southeast of the modern city of Baghdad in Al-Qādisiyyah Governorate, Iraq mark the site of a small Sumerian city state of the mid third millennium BCE, with cultural connections to the cities of Kish, Mari and Ebla. Its contemporary name is uncertain: perhaps this was Eresh. Kesh was suggested by Thorkild Jacobsen before
excavations began. The Euphrates was the city's highway and lifeline; when it shifted its old bed (which was identified to the west of the Main Mound by coring techniques), in the middle third millennium BCE, the city dwindled away. Only eroded traces remain on the site's surface of habitation after the Early Dynastic Period. The site consists of several mounds, the 12 hectare wall enclosed Main (Early Dynastic), the 10 hectare Uruk and Jemdet Nasr, the West, and the 8 hectare South. An examination of the smaller outlying sites showed there was also occupation in the Sasanian, Seleucid, Parthian, and Kassite periods.

Archaeology
Abu Salabikh was excavated by an American expedition from the Oriental Institute of Chicago led by Donald P. Hansen in 1963 and 1965 for a total of 8 weeks. The expedition found around 500 tablets and fragments, containing some of the earliest ancient literature. A number of animal remains were also found including domestic dog, lion, equid, pig, cattle, gazelle, caprines (sheep and goat), and antelope. Remains of various birds were also found.

The site was a British concern after 1975, under the direction of Nicholas Postgate for the British School of Archaeology in Iraq (1975–90). Excavations were suspended with the Invasion of Kuwait (1990); "plans to resume fieldwork have now been abandoned in the light of current political conditions" Postgate reports. The city, built on a rectilinear plan in the early Uruk period, revealed a small but important repertory of cuneiform texts on some 500 tablets, of which the originals were stored in the Iraq Museum, Baghdad.Texts, comparable in date and content with texts from Shuruppak (modern Fara, Iraq) included school texts, literary texts, word lists, and some administrative archives, as well as the Instructions of Shuruppak, a well-known Sumerian "wisdom' text of which the Abu Salabikh tablet is the oldest copy. A list of deities includes the oldest known mention of the Semitic god Baʿal. Postgate's interdisciplinary approach was integrated under the broad aim of describing the daily life of a small Sumerian city, down to the lives of the simplest illiterate inhabitants.

On the Uruk mound, which was abandoned after the Jemmdet Nasr period, 1650 high fired clay sickles were found.

Two grain samples from the Middle Uruk layer of the Uruk Mound were accelerator radiocarbon dated with calibrated dates of 3520 ± 130 BC. Calibration was based on that of Pearson.

See also
Cities of the Ancient Near East

References

Further reading
 Matthews, R. and Matthews, W. (2017) A palace for the king of Eres? Evidence from the Early Dynastic City of Abu Salabikh, south Iraq. In: Heffron, Y., Stone, A. and Worthington, M. (eds.) At the dawn of history. Ancient Near Eastern studies in honour of J. N. Postgate. Eisenbrauns, Winona Lake, pp. 359–367. 
Wencel, M., "ABU SALABIKH – ABSOLUTE RADIOCARBON CHRONOLOGY.", Iraq, vol. 83, pp. 245–258, 2021 
Robert D. Biggs, The Abu Salabikh Tablets. A Preliminary Survey, Journal of Cuneiform Studies, vol. 20, no. 2, pp. 73–88, 1966
CRAWFORD, Harriet E. W., "SOME FIRE INSTALLATIONS FROM ABU SALABIKH, IRAQ (Dedicated to the Memory of Margaret Munn-Rankin)", Paléorient, vol. 7, no. 2, pp. 105–14, 1981
Crawford, H. E. W., "More Fire Installations from Abu Salabikh", Iraq, vol. 45, no. 1, pp. 32–34, 1983
Angela von den Driesch, "Fischknochen Aus Abu Salabikh/Iraq", Iraq, vol. 48, pp. 31–38, 1986
JONES, Jennifer E., "Standardized Volumes? Mass-Produced Bowls of the Jemdet Nasr Period from Abu Salabikh, Iraq", Paléorient, vol. 22, no. 1, pp. 153–60, 1996
Postgate, J. N., and Moorey, P. R. S., "Excavations at Abu Salabikh, 1975", Iraq, vol. 38, pp. 133–69, 1976
Moon, Jane, "Some New Early Dynastic Pottery from Abu Salabikh", Iraq, vol. 43, no. 1, pp. 47–75, 1981
Payne, Joan Crowfoot, "An Early Dynastic III Flint Industry from Abu Salabikh", Iraq, vol. 42, no. 2, pp. 105–19, 1980
POLLOCK, S., "POLITICAL ECONOMY AS VIEWED FROM THE GARBAGE DUMP : JEMDET NASR OCCUPATION AT THE URUK MOUND, ABU SALABIKH", Paléorient, vol. 16, no. 1, pp. 57–75, 1990
Pollock, Susan, "Making Fire in Uruk-Period Abu Salabikh", At the Dawn of History: Ancient Near Eastern Studies in Honour of J. N. Postgate, edited by Yağmur Heffron, Adam Stone and Martin Worthington, University Park, USA: Penn State University Press, pp. 413-422, 2017
Nicholas Postgate and J.A. Moon, "Excavations at Abu Salabikh 1981", Iraq, vol. 44, no. 2, pp. 103–136, 1982
Nicholas Postgate, "Excavations at Abu Salabikh 1983", Iraq, vol. 46, pp. 95–114, 1984
Postgate, J. N. - Killick, J. A., "British Archaeological Expedition to Abu Salabikh, Final Field Report on the 8th Season", Sumer, vol.  39, pp. 95-99, 1983
R.J. Matthews and Nicholas Postgate, "Excavations at Abu Salabikh 1985-86", Iraq, vol. 49, pp. 91–120, 1987
Nicholas Postgate, "Excavations at Abu Salabikh 1988-89", Iraq, vol. 52, pp. 95–106, 1990
 S. Pollock, M. Pope and C. Coursey, "Household Production at the Uruk Mound, Abu Salabikh, Iraq," American Journal of Archaeology, vol. 100, no. 4, pp. 683–698, 1996
Nicholas Postgate, “Early Dynastic burial customs at Abu Salabikh”, in Sumer 36, pp. 65–82, 1980
Postgate J.N. and Moon J.A., Excavations at Abu Salabikh, a Sumerian city, National Geographic Research Reports: 1976 projects, vol. 17, pp. 721–743, 1984
Unger-Hamilton, Romana, et al., "Drill bits from Abu Salabikh, Iraq", MOM Éditions 15.1, pp. 269-285, 1987
Abu Salabikh Excavations:
Volume I -  J.N. Postgate, "The West Mound Surface Clearance",Oxbow Books, 1983  PDF 
Volume II - H.P. Martin, J. Moon & J.N. Postgate, "Graves 1 to 99", Oxbow Books, 1985  PDF 
Volume III - Jane Moon, "Catalogue of Early Dynastic Pottery", Oxbow Books, 1987  PDF 
Volume IV - A.N. Green, "The 6G Ash-Tip and its Contents: Cultic and Administrative Discard from the Temple?",  Oxbow Books, 1993  PDF

External links
Abu Salabikh, Iraq 1988: the diary of an archaeological excavation By Jerry Youle - British Institute for the Study of Iraq
Digital tables from Abu Salabikh at CDLI
Site photographs from Oriental Institute

Populated places established in the 3rd millennium BC
Populated places disestablished in the 3rd millennium BC
Al-Qādisiyyah Governorate
Archaeological sites in Iraq
Sumerian cities
Former populated places in Iraq
Tells (archaeology)
Kish civilization
Early Dynastic Period (Mesopotamia)
Uruk period
City-states